In the USA, Black-owned businesses (or Black businesses), also known as African-American businesses, originated in the days of slavery before 1865. Emancipation and civil rights permitted businessmen to operate inside the American legal structure starting in the Reconstruction Era (1863–77)  and afterwards.  By the 1890s, thousands of small business operations had opened in urban areas. The most rapid growth came in the early 20th century, as the increasingly rigid Jim Crow system of segregation moved urban Blacks into a community large enough to support a business establishment. The National Negro Business League—which Booker T. Washington, college president, promoted—opened over 600 chapters. It reached every city with a significant Black population.

African-Americans have operated virtually every kind of company, but some of the most prominent Black-owned businesses have been insurance companies, banks, recording labels, funeral parlors, barber shops, beauty salons, restaurants, soul food restaurants, record stores, and bookstores.

By 1920, there were tens of thousands of Black businesses, the great majority of them quite small. The largest were insurance companies. The League had grown so large that it supported numerous offshoots, serving bankers, publishers, lawyers, funeral directors, retailers and insurance agents. The Great Depression of 1929-39 was a serious blow, as cash income fell in the Black community because of very high unemployment, and many smaller businesses closed down. During World War II many employees and owners switched over to high-paying jobs in munitions factories.  Black businessmen generally were more conservative elements of their community, but typically did support the Civil Rights Movement. By the 1970s, federal programs to promote minority business activity provided new funding, although the opening world of mainstream management in large corporations attracted a great deal of talent. Black entrepreneurs originally based in music and sports diversified to build "brand" names that made for success in the advertising and media worlds.

Before Emancipation  (until 1865) 
Black entrepreneurship can be traced back to when Africans were first forcibly brought to North America in the 16th century. Many African-Americans who gained their freedom from slavery opened their own businesses, and even some enslaved African-Americans were able to operate businesses, either as skilled tradespeople or as minor traders and peddlers.  Enslaved African-Americans operated businesses both with and without their owners' permission.

Free blacks facing a generally hostile environment occasionally operated small businesses. Profit-making businesses were created by more free and enslaved African-Americans than one might realize from the usual survey of antebellum America. When the opportunity presented itself, it was taken by these men and women, sometimes timidly, sometimes whole-heartedly, and often endorsed by the masters of the enslaved. Businesses often evolved out of skills or specialties the business owner, or service provider, already knew. Examples include:
 Tobacconist – As a young enslaved man, Lunsford Lane recalls selling a basket of peaches for money he could keep and very soon, he says, "plans for money-making took the principal possession of my thoughts." In six to eight years he had amassed one thousand dollars, enough to purchase his freedom, as we read from The Narrative of Lunsford Lane (1842).
 Shoemaker –  William J. Brown was born into a free black family in Rhode Island and as a young man faced discrimination and often unethical treatment from whites as he strove to pursue a trade and career. In his selection from his Life of William J. Brown of Providence, R. I. (1883) we read his frustrating experiences as a store clerk and apprentice shoemaker.
 Sailmaker – James Forten Sr., a freeman and grandfather of Charlotte Forten (see #3: Free-born), learned the sail-making trade after the Revolution, bought his employer's business, and later became the wealthiest black man in Philadelphia. In this 1835 article from the white journal The Anti-Slavery Record, a white reporter describes a visit to Forten's sailmaking business.
 Barber – After being emancipated by his enslaver in 1820, William Johnson became a successful black businessman in Natchez, Mississippi, operating a barber shop, loaning money and acquiring real estate.
 Merchant – Free-born in Philadelphia, Mifflin Gibbs became a businessman, lawyer, politician, and abolitionist. For several years he operated a clothing store in San Francisco, which he we learn from his autobiography Shadow and Light (1902).
 Dressmaker – After purchasing her freedom in St. Louis, Elizabeth Keckley moved to Washington, DC, and became the dressmaker for Mary Todd Lincoln, producing elegant gowns for the capital's elite women. Her 1868 autobiography Behind the Scenes display her ardor and initiative in creating her business and her life.

Reconstruction (1865–1900)
Emancipation and civil rights permitted businessmen to operate inside the American legal structure starting in the Reconstruction Era (1863–77)  and afterwards. By the 1890s, thousands of small business operations had opened in urban areas.From the late 1880s there was a remarkable development of Negro business – banks and insurance companies, undertakers and retail stores.... It occurred at a time when Negro barbers, tailors, caterers, trainmen, blacksmiths, and other artisans were losing their white customers. Depending upon the Negro market, the promoters of the new enterprises naturally upheld the spirit of racial self-help and solidarity.for detailed national report on the numbers of black businessmen and their finances in 1890, see Andrew F. Hilyer, "The Colored American in Business," pp 13-22 in .Memphis Tennessee was the base for Robert Reed Church (1839–1912), a freedman who became the South's first black millionaire. He made his wealth from speculation in city real estate, much of it after Memphis became depopulated after the yellow fever epidemics. He founded the city's first black-owned bank, Solvent Savings Bank and Trust, ensuring that the black community could get loans to establish businesses. He was deeply involved in local and national Republican politics and directed patronage to the black community. His son Robert Reed Church Jr., became a major politician in Memphis. He was a leader of black society and a benefactor in numerous causes.

Black communities were undoubtedly negatively affected by the enforcement of racial segregation in cities and urban areas where blacks were limited in what residential areas they could occupy. Whether in the South or the North, segregation limited the social, educational, and economic progress of the varying black communities forced into this racist social practice. However, new economic, anthropological and census research conducted establishes how black communities in the North during the late 19th century fought against racial segregation by donning new attitudes towards commerce and entrepreneurship. Racial segregation in the North during the late 19th century saw a considerable rise in black entrepreneurship and black-owned small businesses within their respective communities. These small business owners were able to take advantage of constraints placed upon the African-American communities, and exploit a market of untapped black consumers that at the time were not allowed a great deal of purchasing power in white economic markets. This rise in "negro markets" as framed by St. Clair Drake and Horace R. Clayton in Black Metropolis occurred in the South Side of cities like Chicago where African-Americans established a region of their own where the number of black-owned businesses reached 2,500 by 1937 in South Side Chicago.

The Golden Age (1900–1930) 

The nadir of race relations was reached in the early 20th century, in terms of political and legal rights. Blacks were increasingly segregated. However the more they were cut off from the larger white community, the more black entrepreneurs succeeded in establishing flourishing businesses that catered to a black clientele.

The most rapid growth came in the early 20th century as the increasingly rigid Jim Crow system of segregation moved urban blacks into a community large enough to support a business establishment. The National Negro Business League, promoted by college president Booker T. Washington, opened over 600 chapters, reaching every city with a significant black population.

By 1920, there were tens of thousands of black businesses, the great majority of them quite small. The largest were insurance companies. The League had grown so large that it supported numerous offshoots, including the National Negro Bankers Association, the National Negro Press Association, the National Association of Negro Funeral Directors, the National Negro Bar Association, the National Association of Negro Insurance Men, the National Negro Retail Merchants' Association, the National Association of Negro Real Estate Dealers, and the National Negro Finance Corporation.  The Great Depression of 1929-39 was a serious blow, as cash income fell in the black community because of unemployment and many smaller businesses closing down. During World War II many employees can indeed owners switched over to high-paying jobs in munitions factories. Black businessmen generally were more conservative elements of their community, but typically did support the civil rights movement. By the 1970s, federal programs to promote minority business activity provided new funding, although the opening world of mainstream management attracted a great deal of talent.

In urban areas, North and South, the size and income of the black population was growing, providing openings for a wide range of businesses, from barbershops  to insurance companies.  Undertakers had a special niche, and often played a political role.

Historian Juliet Walker calls 1900–1930 the "Golden age of black business." According to the National Negro Business League, the number black-owned businesses doubled from 20,000 1900 and 40,000 in 1914. There were 450 undertakers in 1900 and, rising to 1000. Drugstores rose from 250 to 695. Local retail merchants – most of them quite small – jumped from 10,000 to 25,000.

One of the leading centers of black business was Atlanta. According to August Meier and David Lewis, 1900 was the turning point as white businessmen reduced their contacts with black customers, black entrepreneurs rush to fill the vacuum by starting banks, insurance companies,  and numerous local retailers and service providers. Furthermore, the number of black doctors and lawyers increased sharply. All this of course was in addition to the traditional businesses, such as undertakers and barbershops that had always depended on a black clientele. Durham, North Carolina, a new industrial city based on tobacco manufacturing and cotton mills, was noted for the growth of its black businesses. Durham lacked traditionalism based on plantation-era slavery, and practiced a laissez-faire that allowed black entrepreneurs to flourish.

College president Booker T. Washington (1856–1915), who ran the National Negro Business League, was the most prominent promoter of black business. He moved from city to city to sign up local entrepreneurs into his national network the National Negro Business League.

In 1915, C.R. Patterson and Sons under the leadership of Frederick Patterson, founded the first African-American car manufacturing company of the Greenfield-Patterson car which remained active until 1939.

By the 1920s, the federal government had set up a small unit to distribute information to black entrepreneurs, but no financial aid was forthcoming.

By far the most prominent black entrepreneur of the century of was Charles Clinton Spaulding (1874 – 1952), president of North Carolina Mutual Life Insurance Company in Durham, North Carolina. It was the nation's largest black-owned business. It operated a system of industrial insurance, whereby its salesmen collected small premiums of about 10 cents every week from its clients. That provided them insurance for the following week; if the client died the salesman immediately arranged payment of the death benefit of about $100. That paid for suitable funeral, which was a high prestige event to the black community. Black undertakers also benefited and themselves became prominent business men.  By 1970, they grossed more than $120 million for 150,000 race funerals each year.

African-Americans were tourist entrepreneurs in certain resort areas, such as Oak Bluffs, Massachusetts, and developed on a greater scale, Idlewild, Michigan.

Newspapers and magazines

African-American newspapers flourished in the major cities, with publishers playing a major role in politics and business affairs. Representative leaders included Robert Sengstacke Abbott (1870–1940), publisher of the Chicago Defender; John Mitchell Jr. (1863–1929), editor of the Richmond Planet and president of the National Afro-American Press Association; Anthony Overton (1865–1946), publisher of the Chicago Bee, and Robert Lee Vann (1879–1940), the publisher and editor of the Pittsburgh Courier. Leon H. Washington Jr. founded the Los Angeles Sentinel in 1933.

John H. Johnson (1918–2005) was the founder of the Johnson Publishing Company in 1942.  He rose from poverty to millionaire by the time he was thirty-one.  In 1982, he became the first African-American to appear on the Forbes 400. Johnson's Ebony and Jet magazines were among the most influential African-American media by 1950.

Beauty entrepreneurs 
Most of the African-Americans in business were men, however, women played a major role especially in the area of beauty. Standards of beauty were different for whites and blacks, and the black community developed its own standards, with an emphasis on hair care. Beauticians could work out of their own homes and did not need storefronts. As a result, black beauticians were numerous in the rural South, despite the absence of cities and towns. They pioneered the use of cosmetics, at a time when rural white women in the South avoided them. As Blain Roberts has shown, beauticians offered their clients a space to feel pampered and beautiful in the context of their own community because, "Inside black beauty shops, rituals of beautification converged with rituals of socialization." Beauty contests emerged in the 1920s, and in the white community, they were linked to agricultural county fairs. By contrast in the black community, beauty contests were developed out of the homecoming ceremonies at their high schools and colleges.

The most famous entrepreneur was Madame C.J. Walker (1867–1919); she built a national franchise business called Madame C.J. Walker Manufacturing Company based on her invention of the first successful hair straightening process. Marjorie Joyner (1896–1994) was the first black graduate of a beauty school in Chicago, where she got to know Madame Walker and became her agent. By 1919 Joyner was the national supervisor over Walker's 200 beauty schools. A major role was sending their hairstylists door-to-door, dressed in black skirts and white blouses with black satchels containing a range of beauty products that were applied in the customer's house. Joyner taught some 15,000 stylists over her fifty-year career. She was also a leader in developing new products, such as her permanent wave machine. She helped write the first cosmetology laws for the state of Illinois and founded both a sorority and a national association for black beauticians. Joyner was friends with Eleanor Roosevelt, and helped found the National Council of Negro Women. She was an advisor to the Democratic National Committee in the 1940s and advised several New Deal agencies trying to reach out to black women. Joyner was highly visible in the Chicago black community, as head of the Chicago Defender Charity network, and fundraiser for various schools. In 1987 the Smithsonian Institution in Washington opened an exhibit featuring Joyner's permanent wave machine and a replica of her original salon.

The leading beauty salon for black women in Washington was operated by the sisters Elizabeth Cardozo Parker (1900–1981) and Margaret Cardozo Holmes (1898–1991) from 1929 to 1971. The Cardozo Sisters Hair Stylists expanded to five storefronts stretching an entire city block near the campus of Howard University, with 25 employees assisting up to 200 clients a day.  They had a voice in the national beauticians community, and demanded an end to discriminatory practices.

Rose Meta Morgan (1912–2008) founded the House of Beauty salon to promote African-American standards of beauty, in opposition to those "white" standards that sought silky straight hair and light skin. Born in rural Mississippi, she moved to Chicago as a child and showed entrepreneurial skills as a teenager. She relocated to New York City in 1938, where her small beauty shop became the world's largest African-American beauty parlor. She staged fashion shows in Harlem, and sold her brand of cosmetics designed "to glorify a woman of color". She was briefly married to the famous heavyweight boxing champion Joe Louis from 1955 to 1958. In 1965 she founded New York City's only black commercial bank, Freedom National Bank; in 1972 she set up a franchise operation for beauticians.  Vera Moore (b 1950) marketed her unique brands of Vera Moore Cosmetics, including some products developed by her husband. She opened stores and upscale malls and had superstars as clients.

Small business
In addition to the more prominent businesses listed above,  African-Americans have strong traditions of owning and operating small businesses such as restaurants, drug stores, newsstands, corner stores, candy shops, liquor stores, groceries, bars, and gas stations.

African-Americans also have a length history of ownership in music-related businesses, including record stores, nightclubs, and record labels. African-American bookstores were closely tied to radical political movements, including Black Power, black nationalism, pan-Africanism, and Marxism. African-American-owned funeral homes also served an important role during the civil rights movement. These spaces allowed for the violence committed by white citizens to be made more public through photography and television.

"Double duty dollars"

The term '"double duty dollar"' was used in the US from the early 1900s through the early 1960s, to express the notion that dollars spent with businesses hiring blacks simultaneously purchased a commodity and advanced the race.  Where that concept applied, retailers who excluded African-Americans as employees effectively excluded them as patrons too.

Religious leaders and social activists such as Booker T. Washington and Marcus Garvey urged their communities to redirect their dollars from suppliers who excluded African-Americans to suppliers with more inclusive practices. In the 1940s and 1950s, Leon Sullivan applied the broader phrase selective patronage to note consumers' choice of suppliers as a tool a) to influence suppliers toward fairer, more just interactions with African-Americans, and b) to build demand for African-American suppliers.  In retrospect, the movement had little impact.

The national agenda 
Minority entrepreneurship entered the national agenda in 1927 when Secretary of Commerce Herbert Hoover set up a Division of Negro Affairs to provide advice, and disseminate information to both white and black businessman on how to reach the black consumer. Entrepreneurship was not on the New Deal agenda after 1933. However, when Washington turned to war preparation in 1940, the Division of Negro Affairs tried to help black business secure defense contracts. Black businesses were not oriented toward manufacturing in the first place, and generally were too small to secure any major contracts. President Eisenhower disbanded the agency in 1953.  With the civil rights movement at full blast, Lyndon Johnson coupled black entrepreneurship with his war on poverty, setting up special program in the Small Business Administration, the Office of Economic Opportunity, and other agencies. This time there was money for loans designed to boost minority business ownership. Richard Nixon greatly expanded the program, setting up the Office of Minority Business Enterprise (OMBE) in the expectation that black entrepreneurs would help defuse racial tensions and possibly support his reelection .

The national market
Most national corporations before the 1960s ignored the black market, and paid little attention to working with black merchants or hiring blacks for responsible positions. Pepsi-Cola was a major exception, as the number two brand fought for parity with Coca-Cola.  The upstart soda brand hired Edward F. Boyd  (1914–2007), a pioneer black advertiser.  Boyd hired local black promoters who penetrated into black markets across the South and the urban North. Journalist Stephanie Capparell interviewed six men who were on the team in the late 1940s: The team members had a grueling schedule, working seven days a week, morning and night, for weeks on end. They visited bottlers, churches, "ladies groups," schools, college campuses, YMCAs, community centers, insurance conventions, teacher and doctor conferences, and various civic organizations. They got famous jazzmen such as Duke Ellington and Lionel Hampton to give shout-outs for Pepsi from the stage. No group was too small or too large to target for a promotion. Pepsi advertisements avoided the stereotypical images common in the major media that depicted one-dimensional Aunt Jemimas and Uncle Bens whose role was to draw a smile from white customers. Instead it portrayed black customers as self-confident middle-class citizens who showed very good taste in their soft drinks. They were economical too, as Pepsi bottles were twice the size.

In 1968, the first black-owned McDonald's franchise opened in Chicago.

The 21st century
In 2002, African-American-owned businesses accounted for 1.2 million of the United States' 23 million businesses.  African-American-owned businesses account for approximately 2 million US businesses. Black-owned businesses experienced the largest growth in number of businesses among minorities from 2002 to 2011. The internet enabled black-owned businesses such as McBride Sisters Wine Company to become visible and reach a larger market than would have been possible pre-internet. 

The Dodd–Frank Wall Street Reform and Consumer Protection Act of 2010 had as one goal to assist Black-owned businesses land more federal contracts. It required federal agencies to open an Office of Minority and Women Inclusion (OMWI) to track their diversity efforts in workforce hiring and procurement.

Additionally African-American businessmen became more visible including billionaire BET founder Robert L. Johnson and private equity manager Robert F. Smith.In 2015 The US Census Reported that there were 2.6 million black or African-American-owned firms nationally in 2012, up from 1.9 million or 34.5 percent from 2007. Many apps and online directories, such as The Nile List or Official Black Wallstreet, have emerged offering a database of African-American-owned businesses that consumers can support.

Black entrepreneurs originally based in music and sports diversified to build "brand" names that made for success in the advertising and media worlds. The most prominent examples include media mogul Oprah Winfrey who became involved in numerous enterprises such as a book club that changed the way America reads.  Basketball superstar Magic Johnson was named by Ebony magazine as one of America's most influential Black businessmen in 2009, Johnson has numerous business interests, and was a part-owner of the Lakers for several years. Johnson also is part of a group of investors that purchased the Los Angeles Dodgers in 2012 and the Los Angeles Sparks in 2014.

During the 21st Century there have been multiple mediums for African-American-owned businesses to gain the public eye. Shark Tank, has provided a medium for many Black-owned businesses to acquire investors, promote their business, and share their story with the world. One of the largest Black-owned companies on Shark Tank was a company called U-Lace. U-Lace was a no-tie shoe lace owned by Tim Talley out of Rochester, New York. Mark Cuban acquired a 35% equity in the company for an investment of 200k. This investment increased revenue to over $3 million. Another successful company to come out of Shark Tank was a company called Simply Panache Products. This company makes mango preserves and did not receive any investment from the Sharks. This did not discourage or inhibit their future because they have now developed hotels, spas, and restaurants over the mango theme, showing that not only did they not need the help of an investment, but proving their resilience and dedication to their business.

The pandemic has been a factor in Black-owned businesses and how they are performing during this time period. A research study conducted by the Federal Reserve has found that Black-owned businesses have been hit harder in the pandemic than others because of their geography, limited reach to key federal aid programs, and weaker ties to banks. They found that counties with high concentrations of Black-owned businesses had a high amount of Covid-19 cases, meanwhile counties with higher shares of white-owned businesses had a lower incidence of Covid-19 cases. The result of this is the direct (longer forced closure, Covid-19 symptoms) and indirect (social distancing, fewer customers) changes on the Black-owned businesses. The Paycheck Protection Program, which has $670 billion in loans to help small businesses, saw less volume of their loans go through the program to high concentrated areas of Black-owned businesses. The Federal Reserve found in their study that in "30 U.S. counties that contain 40% of receipts from Black-owned businesses, about 15%-20% of firms received Paycheck Protection Program loans", a rate in line with the national average. However, they found that there is a significant variation across the 30 countries with lower volumes in areas such as the Bronx, New York, Wayne County, Michigan, and Detroit, Michigan. They concluded that a massive reason for this is their geography and the current situation that each of those areas faced at the time with the pandemic. Another part of the study found that the Paycheck Protection Program may have given less loans to Black-owned businesses because of their weak ties to financial institutions. At the beginning of the pandemic, many large banks prioritized customers whom with they had existing relationships in an effort to manage the overwhelming demand for loans and support. The last part of the study found that Black-owned businesses are less likely to have a recent borrowing relationship with a bank. The Federal Reserve concluded their study with the statement of, "To have the greatest impact, the next round of Covid-19 relief should be more targeted geographically to focus on the hardest hit areas and communities that lack critical infrastructure (hospitals, banks) to ameliorate the gaps".

During the 2020–21 United States racial unrest, spurred by messages on social media, American consumers sought out Black-owned businesses to support. June saw record high Google searches for "Black-owned businesses near me" and smartphone restaurant discovery apps added features for discovering Black-owned restaurants. Businesses on social media lists saw significantly increased sales. Black-owned bookstores in particular had difficulty meeting demand. The Black-owned Greenwood digital bank opened in 2020 to provide financial services specifically for Americans of color and encourage competition from larger banks.

There is now a large selection of public resources that are available which allow for Black-owned businesses to receive help. These resources aid the businesses furthermore since Black-owned companies have been hit hard during the COVID-19 disruptions. Resources that allow for these businesses to get ahead and give guidance. The Black Business Association, based out of Los Angeles, is a non-profit that goes to aid in networking and offers training. Black founders are a group that specializes in technology entrepreneurship. While Black Owned Everything has the approach of allowing black businesses to spread their advertisements in the form of pictures. This company uses the popular social media app Instagram to spread its information.

Prominent figures

See also

 American business history
 Black conservatism 
 Civil rights movement (1896–1954)
 Civil rights movement (1865–1896)
 List of 19th-century African-American civil rights activists
 African-American history
 African-American newspapers
 Double-duty dollar
 Economy of the United States

Notes

Further reading 
 Ahiarah, Sol. "Black Americans’ business ownership factors: A theoretical perspective." The Review of Black Political Economy 22.2 (1993): 15-39. abstract
 Conrad Cecilia A. and John Whitehead, eds. African Americans in the U.S. Economy (2005) ch 25-30, 42.
Davis, Joshua Clark, From Head Shops to Whole Foods: The Rise and Fall of Activist Businesses (Columbia University Press, 2017).
 Davis, Joshua Clark, "For the Records: How African American Consumers and Music Retailers Created Commercial Public Space in the 1960s and 1970s South," Southern Cultures, Winter 2011
 Davis, Joshua Clark, "Black-Owned Bookstores: Anchors of the Black Power Movement," Black Perspectives, January 28, 2017.
 Du Bois, William Edward Burghardt. The Negro in business: report of a social study made under the direction of Atlanta University (1899); detailed sociological report by Du Bois and others on the conditions in the 1890s.
 Hammond, Theresa A. A white-collar profession: African American certified public accountants since 1921 (U of North Carolina Press, 2003).
 Harlan, Louis R. "Booker T. Washington and the National Negro Business League" in Raymond W. Smock, ed. Booker T. Washington in Perspective: Essays of Louis R. Harlan (1988) pp. 98–109. online
 Green, Shelley, and Paul L. Pryde. Black entrepreneurship in America (1989).
 Kijakazi, Kilolo. African American Economic Development and Small Business Ownership (1997).
 Rogers, W. Sherman. The African American Entrepreneur: Then and Now (2010) online
 Sharp, Kelly K. "Current trends in African American business history of the nineteenth and twentieth centuries: Recent historiography and applications of the field" History Compass vol 18, Issue 1  (January 2020)  online
 Sluby, Patricia Carter. The Entrepreneurial Spirit of African American Inventors (2011).
 
 Walker, Juliet E. K. The History of Black Business in America: Capitalism, Race, Entrepreneurship: Volume 1, To 1865 (2009), vol. 2 not yet published.
 Walker, Juliet E. K. Encyclopedia of African American Business History (1999) online; 755pp
 Walker, Juliet E.K. "Black Entrepreneurship: An Historical Inquiry." Business and Economic History (1983): 37–55. online
 Walker, Susannah. Style and Status: Selling Beauty to African American Women, 1920–1975 (U of Kentucky Press, 2007), 250 pp. illustrations.
 Weems, Robert E. "A crumbling legacy: The decline of African American insurance companies in contemporary America." Review of Black Political Economy 23#2 (1994): 25–37. online
 Weems, Robert E. Desegregating the dollar: African American consumerism in the twentieth century (NYU Press, 1998).

Entrepreneurs and businesses
 Beito, David T. and Beito, Linda Royster,  Black Maverick: T.R.M. Howard's Fight for Civil Rights and Economic Power, (U of Illinois Press, 2009). excerpt
 Boyd, Robert L. "Ethnic competition for an occupational niche: The case of Black and Italian barbers in northern US cities during the late nineteenth century." Sociological Focus 35#3 (2002): 247–265.
 Boyd, Robert L. "Black Retail Enterprise and Racial Segregation in Northern Cities before the “Ghetto”." Sociological Perspectives 53#3 (2010): 397-417.
 Boyd, Robert L. "Transformation of the Black Business Elite*." Social science quarterly 87.3 (2006): 602–617.
 Gatewood, Willard B. "Aristocrats of Color: South and North The Black Elite, 1880-1920." Journal of Southern History 54#1 (1988): 3-20. in JSTOR
 Harris, Abram Lincoln. The negro as capitalist: A study of banking and business among American negroes (1936). online
 Henderson, Alexa Benson. Atlanta Life Insurance Company: Guardian of Black Economic Dignity 1990).
 
 Weems, Robert E. "The Chicago Metropolitan Mutual Assurance Company: A Profile of a Black-Owned Enterprise." Illinois Historical Journal 86#1 (1993): 15–26. in JSTOR
 Weems, Robert E. Black Business in the Black Metropolis: The Chicago Metropolitan Assurance Company, 1925-1985 (2000)
 Weare, Walter B. Black Business in the New South: A Social History of the NC Mutual Life Insurance Company (1993)
 Weare, Walter B. "Charles Clinton Spaulding:  Middle-Class Leadership in the Age of Segregation," in John Hope Franklin and August Meier, eds., Black leaders of the twentieth century (U of Illinois Press, 1982), 166–90. Spaulding was head of NC Mutual Life Insurance Company, 1900–1952.

Primary sources
 Du Bois, W. E. B. ed. The Negro in Business: Report of a Social Study Made Under the Direction of Atlanta University, Together with the Proceedings of the Fourth Conference ... Held at Atlanta University, May 30–31, 1899 (1899) online
 National Negro Business League, Proceedings of the National Negro Business League: Its First Meeting, Held in Boston, Massachusetts, August 23 and 24, 1900. Boston: J.E. Hamm, Publisher, 1901.
 Washington, Booker T. The Negro in Business (1907) online free

 
 
Economic history of the United States
African-American upper class